SOFRETU (Société française d'études et de réalisations de transports urbains) was a French transport consulting and project development firm created in 1961 by the RATP.

It has been merged with [Sofrerail] - a SNCF branch, in 1995 and became Systra.

It has been notably involved in the metro planning for Montréal, Mexico City, Santiago de Chile and Tehran.

Engineering companies of France